Henry Sakaida (October 1951  28 August 2018) was an American writer who authored a number of books relating to World War II. He was a third-generation Japanese-American.

Although born in Santa Monica, California in October 1951, he lived in Japan from the age of 3 to 5, before returning to the U.S. In addition, Sakaida attended Rosemead High School and was in class of 1970.

Notable works
 Winged Samurai: Saburo Sakai and the Zero Fighter Pilots (1985)
 Pacific Air Combats WWII – Voices From The Past (1993)
 Siege of Rabaul (1996)
 Imperial Japanese Navy Aces (1997) 
 Japanese Army Air Force Aces (1997)
 B-29 Hunters of the JAAF (with Koji Takaki)(2001)
 Aces of the Rising Sun 1937–1945 (2002)
 Genda's Blade: Japan's Squadron of Aces: 343 Kokutai (2003)
 Heroines of the Soviet Union 1941–45 (2003)
 Heroes of the Soviet Union 1941–45 (2004)
 I-400: Japan's Secret Aircraft Carrying Strike Submarine, Objective Panama Canal (with Koji Takaki and Gary Nila)(2010)
 Nomonhan 1939: The bloody Soviet-Japanese border war (2012)

References

External links
 Homepage

1951 births
2018 deaths
American writers of Japanese descent
American military writers